Apolipoprotein F is a protein that in humans is encoded for by the APOF gene.

The product of this gene is one of the minor apolipoproteins found in plasma. This protein forms complexes with lipoproteins and may be involved in transport and/or esterification of cholesterol.

References

External links

Further reading